Patrick Joseph Kennedy may refer to:

 P. J. Kennedy (1858–1929), member of the Kennedy family who served in the Massachusetts House of Representatives and Massachusetts State Senate
 Patrick J. Kennedy (born 1967), former Rhode Island congressman and great-grandson of the above